The Lotus 19 or Monte Carlo is a mid-engine sports-racing car designed by Colin Chapman of Lotus and built from 1960 until 1962.

Lotus 19
The 19 is a mid-engine, rear wheel drive sports racer with a fiberglass body over a space frame, originally designed with 1.5 - 2.75L Coventry Climax FPF engine built for Grand Prix cars, mated to Lotus' own five-speed sequential transaxle nicknamed 'Queerbox' which gave a lot of problems on the Lotus 15, but was improved in its reliability for the Lotus 18.

Chapman named the car Monte Carlo to honor Stirling Moss for his win at the 1960 Monaco Grand Prix. Lotus' first F1 victory. This is said to have mimicked and declared competition against the Cooper Monaco, which was named after a win at Monaco in 1958.

19B
Towards the end of 1963, John Klug, founder of Pacesetter Homes Racing, commissioned Lotus to build a special 19 to be Ford V8 powered. Ford's new lightweight iron block 289 c.i. engine was chosen over Oldsmobile's smaller aluminum V8. Roy Campbell finished the car in southern California. Dan Gurney, who had enjoyed considerable success at the wheel of the Arciero Brothers Lotus 19-Climax as the driver.

Because of its unique specification, it was known as the 19B, the only 19 with this designation. Originally delivered in red livery, the car first appeared at Nassau in December 1963. In 1964 it was the fastest sports car in the world, but the car's weak spot was its Colotti transaxle, the failure of which led to a number of retirements. By mid-1965 it was obsolete. It continued racing in southern California and eventually dropped out of sight. Wayne Linden of Roseville, California, found it in a semi trailer waiting to be turned into a dune buggy. He restored it to its early-1964 configuration, except for the Colotti, and ran it in mostly Cobra club events. He sold it to Gordon and Nancy Gimble. Today the car regularly appears at vintage car events in the US and may be on display at  Cobra Experience museum in Martinez, Calif.

Chassis numbers
There were seventeen Lotus 19s built, however many were wrecked and some were completely rebuilt.

Racing victories

Gallery
Images are of Gulf liveried continuation historic Crossle 9S

References

External links
 Tam's Old Race Car Site: Dan Gurney's Lotus 19

19
Sports cars